Yongning District is one of 7 districts of the prefecture-level city of Nanning, the capital of Guangxi Zhuang Autonomous Region, South China. The district was approved to build from the dissolution of the former Yongning County by the Chinese State Council  on September 15, 2004. The district's total area is 1295 square kilometers, and its population in 2004 was 316,000 people.

Administrative divisions
Yongning District administers three towns and two villages. The towns are Pumiao, Xinjiang, and Nalou; the villages are Baiji and Zhonghe.

References

External links
Yongning District government website (Chinese)

County-level divisions of Guangxi
Nanning